Inhaler is an Irish rock band originating from Dublin. Formed in 2012, the band consists of vocalist and guitarist Elijah Hewson (son of U2's Bono), bassist Robert Keating, guitarist Josh Jenkinson and drummer Ryan McMahon. Their debut album, It Won't Always Be Like This, was released on 9 July 2021.  It entered the Irish Albums Chart at number one, it also entered the top 10 and top 20 album charts in other European countries such as the Netherlands and Germany. It entered the UK Album Chart at number one. The band's second studio album, Cuts & Bruises, was released on 17 February 2023.

Career

2012–2017: Early years 
Originally formed in 2012 at St Andrews College in Blackrock, Dublin, the band decided on the name Inhaler in 2015. Jenkinson joined the band right after the band name was decided.

2018–2022: It Won't Always Be Like This 
The group self-released their debut single "I Want You" in 2017.  The single was featured on Garageland Volume 1, released on 14 April 2017. This was later followed by three more singles in 2019, namely "It Won't Always Be Like This", "My Honest Face" and "Ice Cream Sundae". They placed fifth on BBC's annual music poll, Sound of 2020. On 21 January 2020, the group released their fourth single, titled "We Have to Move On".

On their 2019–2020 tours, the band released a self-titled debut EP featuring the singles "It Won't Always Be Like This", "Oklahoma" (Late Night Version), "My Honest Face" and "There's No Other Place".
 
For Record Store Day 2020, the band released their singles as limited-edition vinyl records.

The band were one of the winners of the Music Moves Europe Talent Award 2021 and were also shortlisted for the MTV Push UK & Ireland 2021.

On 17 March 2021, the band released a single titled "Cheer Up Baby" and announced that their debut album, It Won't Always Be Like This, would be released on 16 July 2021. On 13 May 2021, the band announced on their social media that the album release would be pushed forward by a week, to be released on 9 July 2021.

The band presented the album live on summer festivals in 2022 (including Glastonbury Festival) and did opening acts for some  Kings of Leon shows on their When You See Yourself tour.

2022–present: Cuts & Bruises 
The band released their second album Cuts & Bruises on 17 February 2023.

Band members 

 

 Elijah Hewson – lead vocals, rhythm guitar (2012–present)
 Robert Keating – bass guitar, backing vocals (2012–present)
 Ryan McMahon – drums (2012–present)
 Josh Jenkinson – lead guitar (2015–present)

Current touring musicians
 Louis Lambert – keyboards, synthesizer (2017–present)

Discography

Studio albums

Singles

Awards and nominations

References

External links

Irish alternative rock groups
Irish indie rock groups
Irish pop rock music groups